James Irvine Dungan (May 29, 1844 – December 28, 1931) was an American lawyer and politician who served as a U.S. Representative from Ohio for one term from 1891 to 1893.

Early life and career 
Born in Canonsburg, Washington County, Pennsylvania, Dungan attended the common schools.
He received an academic education at the local academy at Denmark, Iowa, and at the college at Washington, Iowa.
During the Civil War served as color sergeant in the Nineteenth Regiment, Iowa Volunteer Infantry.
He studied law.
He was admitted to the bar in 1868 and commenced practice in Jackson, Ohio.
Superintendent of schools of Jackson, Ohio, and city and county school examiner, 1867 and 1868.

Political career 
He served as mayor of Jackson, 1869.
He served as member of the State senate from 1877 to 1879.
He served as delegate to the Democratic National Convention, 1880.

Congress 
Dungan was elected as a Democrat to the Fifty-second Congress (March 4, 1891 – March 3, 1893).
He was an unsuccessful candidate for reelection to the Fifty-third Congress in 1892.

Later career and death 
Attorney in the Interior Department from 1893 to 1895.
He returned to Jackson, Ohio, and resumed the practice of law.
City solicitor, 1913.
He engaged in the practice of his profession until his death in Jackson, Ohio, on December 28, 1931.
He was interred in Fairmont Cemetery.

Sources

1844 births
1931 deaths
People from Jackson, Ohio
Union Army soldiers
Ohio lawyers
Mayors of places in Ohio
Democratic Party Ohio state senators
People from Canonsburg, Pennsylvania
People from Lee County, Iowa
People from Washington, Iowa
Democratic Party members of the United States House of Representatives from Ohio